Tony Trabert defeated Ken Rosewall 9–7, 6–3, 6–3 in the final to win the men's singles tennis title at the 1955 U.S. National Championships.

Seeds
The tournament used two lists of eight players for seeding the men's singles event; one for U.S. players and one for foreign players. Tony Trabert is the champion; others show the round in which they were eliminated.

U.S.
  Tony Trabert (champion)
  Vic Seixas (semifinals)
  Ham Richardson (quarterfinals)
  Gilbert Shea (first round)
  Eddie Moylan (fourth round)
  Art Larsen (fourth round)
  Tut Bartzen (quarterfinals)
  Herbie Flam (quarterfinals)

Foreign
  Ken Rosewall (finalist)
  Lew Hoad (semifinals)
  Kurt Nielsen (third round)
  Rex Hartwig (fourth round)
  Nicola Pietrangeli (third round)
  Enrique Morea (fourth round)
  Neale Fraser (fourth round)
  Kosei Kamo (second round)

Draw

Key
 Q = Qualifier
 WC = Wild card
 LL = Lucky loser
 r = Retired

Final eight

Earlier rounds

Section 1

Section 2

Section 3

Section 4

Section 5

Section 6

Section 7

Section 8

References

External links 
 1955 U.S. National Championships on ITFtennis.com, the source for this draw
 Association of Tennis Professionals (ATP) – 1955 U.S. Championships Men's Singles draw

Men's Singles
U.S. National Championships (tennis) by year – Men's singles